Dynasties in Chinese history, or Chinese dynasties, were hereditary monarchical regimes that ruled over China during much of its history. From the legendary inauguration of dynastic rule by Yu the Great circa 2070 BC to the abdication of the Xuantong Emperor on 12 February 1912 in the wake of the Xinhai Revolution, China was ruled by a series of successive dynasties. Dynasties of China were not limited to those established by ethnic Han—the dominant Chinese ethnic group—and its predecessor, the Huaxia tribal confederation, but also included those founded by non-Han peoples.

Dividing Chinese history into periods ruled by dynasties is a convenient method of periodization. Accordingly, a dynasty may be used to delimit the era during which a family reigned, as well as to describe events, trends, personalities, artistic compositions, and artifacts of that period. For example, porcelain made during the Ming dynasty may be referred to as "Ming porcelain". The word "dynasty" is usually omitted when making such adjectival references.

The longest-reigning orthodox dynasty of China was the Zhou dynasty, ruling for a total length of 789 years, albeit it is divided into the Western Zhou and the Eastern Zhou in Chinese historiography, and its power was drastically reduced during the latter part of its rule. The largest orthodox Chinese dynasty in terms of territorial size was either the Yuan dynasty or the Qing dynasty, depending on the historical source.

Chinese dynasties often referred to themselves as "" ("Celestial Dynasty" or "Heavenly Dynasty"). As a form of respect and subordination, Chinese tributary states referred to Chinese dynasties as "" ("Celestial Dynasty of the Exalted State") or "" ("Celestial Dynasty of the Great State").

Terminology
In the Chinese language, the character "" originally meant "morning" and "today". Politically, the word is taken to refer to the regime of the incumbent ruler.

The following is a list of terms associated with the concept of dynasty in Chinese historiography:

 : a dynasty
 : an era corresponding to the rule of a dynasty
 : while technically referring to royal dynasties, this term is often inaccurately applied to all dynasties, including those whose rulers held non-royal titles such as emperor
 : generally used for imperial dynasties

History

Start of dynastic rule

As the founder of China's first orthodox dynasty, the Xia dynasty, Yu the Great is conventionally regarded as the inaugurator of dynastic rule in China. In the Chinese dynastic system, sovereign rulers theoretically possessed absolute power and private ownership of the realm, even though in practice their actual power was dependent on numerous factors. By tradition, the Chinese throne was inherited exclusively by members of the male line, but there were numerous cases whereby the consort kins came to possess de facto power at the expense of the monarchs.

Dynastic transition

The rise and fall of dynasties is a prominent feature of Chinese history. Some scholars have attempted to explain this phenomenon by attributing the success and failure of dynasties to the morality of the rulers, while others have focused on the tangible aspects of monarchical rule. This method of explanation has come to be known as the dynastic cycle.

Cases of dynastic transition in the history of China occurred primarily through two ways: military conquest and usurpation. The supersession of the Liao dynasty by the Jin dynasty was achieved following a series of successful military campaigns, as was the later unification of China proper under the Yuan dynasty; on the other hand, the transition from the Eastern Han to the Cao Wei, as well as from the Southern Qi to the Liang dynasty, were cases of usurpation. Oftentimes, usurpers would seek to portray their predecessors as having relinquished the throne willingly—a process called  ("voluntary abdicating and passing the throne")—as a means to legitimize their rule.

One  might incorrectly infer from viewing historical timelines that transitions between dynasties occurred abruptly and roughly. Rather, new dynasties were often established before the complete overthrow of an existing regime. For example, AD 1644 is frequently cited as the year in which the Qing dynasty succeeded the Ming dynasty in possessing the Mandate of Heaven. However, the Qing dynasty was officially proclaimed in AD 1636 by the Emperor Taizong of Qing through renaming the Later Jin established in AD 1616, while the Ming imperial family would rule the Southern Ming until AD 1662. The Ming loyalist Kingdom of Tungning based in Taiwan continued to oppose the Qing until AD 1683. Meanwhile, other factions also fought for control over China during the Ming–Qing transition, most notably the Shun and the Xi dynasties proclaimed by Li Zicheng and Zhang Xianzhong respectively. This change of ruling houses was a convoluted and prolonged affair, and the Qing took almost two decades to extend their rule over the entirety of China proper.

Similarly, during the earlier Sui–Tang transition, numerous regimes established by rebel forces vied for control and legitimacy as the power of the ruling Sui dynasty weakened. Autonomous regimes that existed during this period of upheaval included, but not limited to, Wei (by Li Mi), Qin (by Xue Ju), Qi (by Gao Tancheng), Xu (by Yuwen Huaji), Liang (by Shen Faxing), Liang (by Liang Shidu), Xia (by Dou Jiande), Zheng (by Wang Shichong), Chu (by Zhu Can), Chu (by Lin Shihong), Wu (by Li Zitong), Yan (by Gao Kaidao), and Song (by Fu Gongshi). The Tang dynasty that superseded the Sui launched a decade-long military campaign to reunify China proper.

The latter served as a means for the reigning dynasty to claim legitimate succession from earlier dynasties. For example, the Emperor Xiaojing of Eastern Wei was accorded the title "Prince of Zhongshan" by the Emperor Wenxuan of Northern Qi following the latter's deposition of the former. Similarly, Chai Yong, a nephew of the Emperor Shizong of Later Zhou, was conferred the title "Duke of Chongyi" by the Emperor Renzong of Song; other descendants of the Later Zhou ruling family came to inherit the noble title thereafter.

According to Chinese historiographical tradition, each new dynasty would compose the history of the preceding dynasty, culminating in the Twenty-Four Histories. This tradition was maintained even after the Xinhai Revolution overthrew the Qing dynasty in favor of the Republic of China. However, the attempt by the Republicans to draft the history of the Qing was disrupted by the Chinese Civil War, which resulted in the political division of China into the People's Republic of China on mainland China and the Republic of China on Taiwan.

End of dynastic rule

Dynastic rule in China collapsed in AD 1912 when the Republic of China superseded the Qing dynasty following the success of the Xinhai Revolution. While there were attempts after the Xinhai Revolution to reinstate dynastic rule in China, they were unsuccessful at consolidating their rule and gaining political legitimacy.

During the Xinhai Revolution, there were numerous proposals advocating for the replacement of the Manchu-led Qing dynasty by a new dynasty of Han ethnicity. Kong Lingyi, the Duke of Yansheng and a 76th-generation descendant of Confucius, was identified as a potential candidate for Chinese emperorship by Liang Qichao. Meanwhile, gentry in Anhui and Hebei supported a restoration of the Ming dynasty under Zhu Yuxun, the Marquis of Extended Grace. Both suggestions were ultimately rejected.

The Empire of China (AD 1915–1916) proclaimed by Yuan Shikai sparked the National Protection War, resulting in the premature collapse of the regime 101 days later. The Manchu Restoration (AD 1917) was an unsuccessful attempt at reviving the Qing dynasty, lasting merely 11 days. Similarly, the Manchukuo (AD 1932–1945; monarchy since AD 1934), a puppet state of the Empire of Japan during World War II with limited diplomatic recognition, is not regarded as a legitimate regime. Ergo, historians usually consider the abdication of the Xuantong Emperor on 12 February 1912 as the end of the Chinese dynastic system. Dynastic rule in China lasted almost four millennia.

Political legitimacy

China was politically divided during multiple periods in its history, with different regions ruled by different dynasties. These dynasties effectively functioned as separate states with their own court and political institutions. Political division existed during the Three Kingdoms, the Sixteen Kingdoms, the Northern and Southern dynasties, and the Five Dynasties and Ten Kingdoms periods, among others.

Relations between Chinese dynasties during periods of division often revolved around political legitimacy, which was derived from the doctrine of the Mandate of Heaven. Dynasties ruled by ethnic Han would proclaim rival dynasties founded by other ethnicities as illegitimate, usually justified based on the concept of Hua–Yi distinction. On the other hand, many dynasties of non-Han origin saw themselves as the legitimate dynasty of China and often sought to portray themselves as the true inheritor of Chinese culture and history.

Such legitimacy dispute existed during the following periods:

 Three Kingdoms
 The Cao Wei, the Shu Han, and the Eastern Wu considered themselves legitimate while simultaneously denounced the rivaling claims of others
 The Emperor Xian of Han abdicated in favor of the Emperor Wen of Cao Wei, hence the Cao Wei directly succeeded the Eastern Han in the timeline of Chinese history
 The Western Jin accepted the Cao Wei as the legitimate dynasty of the Three Kingdoms period and claimed succession from it
 The Tang dynasty viewed the Cao Wei as the legitimate dynasty during this period, whereas the Southern Song scholar Zhu Xi proposed treating the Shu Han as legitimate
 Eastern Jin and Sixteen Kingdoms
 The Eastern Jin proclaimed itself to be legitimate
 Several of the Sixteen Kingdoms such as the Han Zhao, the Later Zhao, and the Former Qin also claimed legitimacy
 Northern and Southern dynasties
 All dynasties during this period saw themselves as the legitimate representative of China; the Northern dynasties referred to their southern counterparts as "" ("island dwelling barbarians"), while the Southern dynasties called their northern neighbors "" ("barbarians with braids")
 Five Dynasties and Ten Kingdoms
 Having directly succeeded the Tang dynasty, the Later Liang considered itself to be a legitimate dynasty
 The Later Tang regarded itself as the restorer of the earlier Tang dynasty and rejected the legitimacy of its predecessor, the Later Liang
 The Later Jin accepted the Later Tang as a legitimate regime
 The Southern Tang was, for a period of time, considered the legitimate dynasty during the Five Dynasties and Ten Kingdoms period
 Since the Song dynasty, Chinese historiography has generally considered the Five Dynasties, as opposed to the contemporary Ten Kingdoms, to be legitimate
 Liao dynasty, Song dynasty, and Jin dynasty
 Following the conquest of the Later Jin, the Liao dynasty claimed legitimacy and succession from it
 Both the Northern Song and Southern Song considered themselves to be the legitimate Chinese dynasty
 The Jin dynasty challenged the Song's claim of legitimacy
 The succeeding Yuan dynasty recognized all three in addition to the Western Liao as legitimate Chinese dynasties, culminating in the composition of the History of Liao, the History of Song, and the History of Jin
 Ming dynasty and Northern Yuan
 The Ming dynasty recognized the preceding Yuan dynasty as a legitimate Chinese dynasty, but asserted that it had succeeded the Mandate of Heaven from the Yuan, thus considering the Northern Yuan as illegitimate
 Northern Yuan rulers maintained the dynastic name "Great Yuan" and claimed traditional Han-style titles continuously until AD 1388 or AD 1402; Han-style titles were restored on several occasions thereafter for brief periods, notably during the reigns of Taisun Khan, Choros Esen, and Dayan Khan
 The historian Rashipunsug argued that the Northern Yuan had succeeded the legitimacy from the Yuan dynasty; the Qing dynasty, which later defeated and annexed the Northern Yuan, inherited this legitimacy, thus rendering the Ming as illegitimate
 Qing dynasty and Southern Ming
 The Qing dynasty recognized the preceding Ming dynasty as legitimate, but asserted that it had succeeded the Mandate of Heaven from the Ming, thus refuting the claimed legitimacy of the Southern Ming
 The Southern Ming continued to claim legitimacy until its eventual defeat by the Qing
 The Ming loyalist Kingdom of Tungning in Taiwan denounced the Qing dynasty as illegitimate
 The Joseon dynasty of Korea and the Later Lê dynasty of Vietnam had at various times considered the Southern Ming, instead of the Qing dynasty, as legitimate

Traditionally, periods of disunity often resulted in heated debates among officials and historians over which prior dynasties could and should be considered orthodox, given that it was politically imperative for a dynasty to present itself as being linked in an unbroken lineage of moral and political authority back to ancient times. However, the Northern Song statesman Ouyang Xiu propounded that such orthodoxy existed in a state of limbo during fragmented periods and was restored after political unification was achieved. From this perspective, the Song dynasty possessed legitimacy by virtue of its ability to end the Five Dynasties and Ten Kingdoms period despite not having succeeded the orthodoxy from the Later Zhou. Similarly, Ouyang considered the concept of orthodoxy to be in oblivion during the Three Kingdoms, the Sixteen Kingdoms, and the Northern and Southern dynasties periods.

Traditionally, as most Chinese historiographical sources uphold the idea of unilineal dynastic succession, only one dynasty could be considered orthodox at any given time. Most historical sources consider the legitimate line of succession to be as follows:

These historical legitimacy disputes are similar to the modern competing claims of legitimacy by the People's Republic of China based in Beijing and the Republic of China based in Taipei. Both regimes formally adhere to the One-China principle and claim to be the sole legitimate representative of the whole of China.

Agnatic lineages

There were several groups of Chinese dynasties that were ruled by families with patrilineal relations, yet due to various reasons these regimes are considered to be separate dynasties and given distinct retroactive names for historiographical purpose. Such conditions as differences in their official dynastic title and fundamental changes having occurred to their rule would necessitate nomenclatural distinction in academia, despite these ruling clans having shared common ancestral origins.

Additionally, numerous other dynasties claimed descent from earlier dynasties as a calculated political move to obtain or enhance their legitimacy, even if such claims were unfounded.

The agnatic relations of the following groups of Chinese dynasties are typically recognized by historians:

 Western Zhou and Eastern Zhou
 
 The Western Zhou and the Eastern Zhou were ruled by the House of Ji; they are collectively known as the Zhou dynasty
 The founder of the Eastern Zhou, the King Ping of Zhou, was a son of the last Western Zhou ruler, the King You of Zhou
 Western Han, Eastern Han, Shu Han, and Liu Song
 The Western Han, the Eastern Han, the Shu Han, and the Liu Song were ruled by the House of Liu; the first two of which are collectively known as the Han dynasty
 The first emperor of the Eastern Han, the Emperor Guangwu of Han, was a ninth-generation descendant of the Western Han founder, the Emperor Gao of Han; he was also a seventh-generation descendant of the sixth Western Han monarch, the Emperor Jing of Han
 The founder of the Shu Han, the Emperor Zhaolie of Shu Han, was also descended from the Emperor Jing of Han
 The Book of Song states that the first Liu Song ruler, the Emperor Wu of Liu Song, was a male-line descendant of a younger brother of the Emperor Gao of Han, the Prince Yuan of Chu
 Western Jin and Eastern Jin
 The Western Jin and the Eastern Jin were ruled by the House of Sima; they are collectively known as the Jin dynasty
 The Eastern Jin founder, the Emperor Yuan of Jin, was a great-grandson of the Emperor Xuan of Jin; he was also a grandson of the Prince Wu of Langya and a son of the Prince Gong of Langya
 Han Zhao and Hu Xia
 The Han Zhao and the Hu Xia were ruled by the House of Luandi (later renamed the House of Liu and the House of Helian respectively)
 The Han Zhao founder, the Emperor Guangwen of Han Zhao, and the Hu Xia founder, the Emperor Wulie of Hu Xia, were descended from Liu Qiangqu and Liu Qubei respectively; according to the History of the Northern Dynasties, Liu Qiangqu and Liu Qibei were brothers
 Former Yan, Later Yan, and Southern Yan
 The Former Yan, the Later Yan, and the Southern Yan were ruled by the House of Murong
 The founder of the Later Yan, the Emperor Chengwu of Later Yan, was a son of the Former Yan founder, the Emperor Wenming of Former Yan
 The first monarch of the Southern Yan, the Emperor Xianwu of Southern Yan, was also a son of the Emperor Wenming of Former Yan
 Northern Wei, Southern Liang, Eastern Wei, and Western Wei
 The Northern Wei, the Southern Liang, the Eastern Wei, and the Western Wei were ruled by the House of Tuoba (later renamed the House of Yuan and the House of Tufa respectively)
 The Northern Wei founder, the Emperor Daowu of Northern Wei, and the Southern Liang founder, the Prince Wu of Southern Liang, were respectively descended from the sons of the Emperor Shengwu of Northern Wei, the Emperor Shenyuan of Northern Wei and Tufa Pigu
 The only ruler of the Eastern Wei, the Emperor Xiaojing of Eastern Wei, was a great-grandson of the seventh emperor of the Northern Wei, the Emperor Xiaowen of Northern Wei
 The Western Wei founder, the Emperor Wen of Western Wei, was a grandson of the Emperor Xiaowen of Northern Wei
 Southern Qi and Liang dynasty
 The Southern Qi and the Liang dynasty were ruled by the House of Xiao
 The founder of the Liang dynasty, the Emperor Wu of Liang, was a son of the Emperor Wen of Liang who was a distant cousin of the Southern Qi founder, the Emperor Gao of Southern Qi
 Western Liang and Tang dynasty
 The Western Liang and the Tang dynasty were ruled by the House of Li
 The founder of the Tang dynasty, the Emperor Gaozu of Tang, was a seventh-generation descendant of the Western Liang founder, the Prince Wuzhao of Western Liang
 Later Han and Northern Han
 The Later Han and the Northern Han were ruled by the House of Liu
 The first ruler of the Northern Han, the Emperor Shizu of Northern Han, was a younger brother of the Later Han founder, the Emperor Gaozu of Later Han
 Liao dynasty and Western Liao
 The Liao dynasty and the Western Liao were ruled by the House of Yelü
 The Western Liao founder, the Emperor Dezong of Western Liao, was an eighth-generation descendant of the first emperor of the Liao dynasty, the Emperor Taizu of Liao
 Northern Song and Southern Song
 The Northern Song and the Southern Song were ruled by the House of Zhao; they are collectively known as the Song dynasty
 The first ruler of the Southern Song, the Emperor Gaozong of Song, was a son of the eighth Northern Song monarch, the Emperor Huizong of Song; he was also a younger brother of the last Northern Song emperor, the Emperor Qinzong of Song
 Yuan dynasty and Northern Yuan
 The Yuan dynasty and the Northern Yuan were ruled by the House of Borjigin
 The Emperor Huizong of Yuan was both the last emperor of the Yuan dynasty and the first ruler of the Northern Yuan
 Ming dynasty and Southern Ming
 The Ming dynasty and the Southern Ming were ruled by the House of Zhu
 The Southern Ming founder, the Hongguang Emperor, was a grandson of the 14th emperor of the Ming dynasty, the Wanli Emperor
 Later Jin and Qing dynasty
 The Later Jin and the Qing dynasty were ruled by the House of Aisin Gioro
 The Emperor Taizong of Qing was both the last Later Jin khan and the first emperor of the Qing dynasty

Classification

Central Plain dynasties
The Central Plain is a vast area on the lower reaches of the Yellow River which formed the cradle of Chinese civilization. "Central Plain dynasties" refer to dynasties of China that had their capital cities situated within the Central Plain. This term could refer to dynasties of both Han and non-Han ethnic origins.

Unified dynasties
"Unified dynasties" refer to dynasties of China, regardless of their ethnic origin, that achieved the unification of China proper. "China proper" is a region generally regarded as the traditional heartland of the Han people, and is not equivalent to the term "China". Imperial dynasties that had attained the unification of China proper may be known as the "Chinese Empire" or the "Empire of China".

The concept of "great unity" or "grand unification" was first mentioned in the Gongyang Commentary on the Spring and Autumn Annals that was supposedly authored by the Qi scholar Gongyang Gao. Other prominent figures like Confucius and Mencius also elaborated on this concept in their respective works.

Historians typically consider the following dynasties to have unified China proper: the Qin dynasty, the Western Han, the Xin dynasty, the Eastern Han, the Western Jin, the Sui dynasty, the Tang dynasty, the Wu Zhou, the Northern Song, the Yuan dynasty, the Ming dynasty, and the Qing dynasty. The status of the Northern Song as a unified dynasty is disputed among historians as the Sixteen Prefectures of Yan and Yun were partially administered by the contemporaneous Liao dynasty while the Western Xia exercised partial control over Hetao; the Northern Song, in this sense, did not truly achieve the unification of China proper.

Infiltration dynasties and conquest dynasties

According to the historian and sinologist Karl August Wittfogel, dynasties of China founded by non-Han peoples that ruled parts or all of China proper could be classified into two types, depending on the means by which the ruling ethnic groups had entered China proper.

"Infiltration dynasties" or "dynasties of infiltration" refer to Chinese dynasties founded by non-Han ethnicities that tended towards accepting Han culture and assimilating into the Han-dominant society. For instance, the Han Zhao and the Northern Wei, established by the Xiongnu and Xianbei ethnicities respectively, are considered infiltration dynasties of China.

"Conquest dynasties" or "dynasties of conquest" refer to dynasties of China established by non-Han peoples that tended towards resisting Han culture and preserving the identities of the ruling ethnicities. For example, the Liao dynasty and the Yuan dynasty, ruled by the Khitan and Mongol peoples respectively, are considered conquest dynasties of China.

These terms remain sources of controversy among scholars who believe that Chinese history should be analyzed and understood from a multiethnic and multicultural perspective.

Naming convention

Official nomenclature
During the rule of a dynasty, its  functioned as the formal name of the state, both internally and for diplomatic purposes.

The formal name of Chinese dynasties was usually derived from one of the following sources:

 The name of the ruling tribe or tribal confederation
 e.g., the Xia dynasty took its name from its ruling class, the Xia tribal confederation
 The noble title held by the dynastic founder prior to the founding of the dynasty
 e.g., the Emperor Wu of Chen adopted the dynastic name "Chen" from his pre-imperial title "Prince of Chen" upon the establishment of the Chen dynasty
 The name of a historical state that occupied the same geographical location as the new dynasty
 e.g., the Former Yan was officially named "Yan" based on the ancient State of Yan located in the same region
 The name of a previous dynasty from which the new dynasty claimed descent or succession from, even if such familial link was questionable
 e.g., the Emperor Taizu of Later Zhou officially proclaimed the Later Zhou with the official title "Zhou" as he claimed ancestry from Guo Shu, a royal of the Zhou dynasty
 A term with auspicious or other significant connotations
 e.g., the Yuan dynasty was officially the "Great Yuan", a name derived from a clause in the Classic of Changes, "" ("Great is the Heavenly and Primal")

There were instances whereby the official name was changed during the reign of a dynasty. For example, the dynasty known retroactively as Southern Han initially used the name "Yue", only to be renamed to "Han" subsequently.

The official title of several dynasties bore the character "" ("great"). In Yongzhuang Xiaopin by the Ming historian Zhu Guozhen, it was claimed that the first dynasty to do so was the Yuan dynasty. However, several sources like the History of Liao and the History of Jin compiled by the Yuan historian Toqto'a revealed that the official dynastic name of some earlier dynasties such as the Liao and the Jin also contained the character "". It was also common for officials, subjects, or tributary states of a particular dynasty to include the term "" (or an equivalent term in other languages) when referring to this dynasty as a form of respect, even if the official dynastic name did not include it. For instance, The Chronicles of Japan referred to the Tang dynasty as "" ("Great Tang") despite its dynastic name being simply "Tang".

Although the Qing dynasty explicitly identified their state with and employed ""—and its Manchu equivalent "Dulimbai Gurun"—in official capacity in numerous international treaties beginning with the Treaty of Nerchinsk dated AD 1689, its dynastic name had remained the "Great Qing". "", which has become nearly synonymous with "China" in modern times, is a concept with geographical, political, and cultural connotations.

Notably, rulers of Vietnam and Korea also declared  for their respective realm.

Retroactive nomenclature
In Chinese historiography, historians generally do not refer to dynasties directly by their official name. Instead, historiographical names, which were most commonly derived from their official name, are used. For instance, the Sui dynasty is known as such because its formal name was "Sui". Likewise, the Jin dynasty was officially the "Great Jin".

When more than one dynasty shared the same Chinese character(s) as their formal name, as was common in Chinese history, prefixes are retroactively applied to dynastic names by historians in order to distinguish between these similarly-named regimes. Frequently used prefixes include:

 Cardinal direction
 "Northern": e.g., Northern Qi, Northern Yuan
 "Southern": e.g., Southern Yan, Southern Tang
 "Eastern": e.g., Eastern Jin, Eastern Wei
 "Western": e.g., Western Liang, Western Liao
 Sequence
 "Former": e.g., Former Qin, Former Shu
 "Later": e.g., Later Zhao, Later Han
 Surname of the ruling family
 e.g., Wu Zhou, Ma Chu
 Other types of prefixes
 e.g., Shu Han (the prefix "Shu" is a reference to the realm's geographical location at Sichuan), Hu Xia (the prefix "Hu", meaning "barbarian", refers to the dynasty's ethnic Xiongnu origin)

A dynasty could be referred to by more than one retroactive name in Chinese historiography, albeit some are more widely used than others. For instance, the Western Han is also known as the "Former Han", and the Yang Wu is also called the "Southern Wu".

Scholars usually make a historiographical distinction for dynasties whose rule were interrupted. For example, the Song dynasty is divided into the Northern Song and the Southern Song, with the Jingkang Incident as the dividing line; the original "Song" founded by the Emperor Taizu of Song was therefore differentiated from the "Song" restored under the Emperor Gaozong of Song. In such cases, the regime had collapsed, only to be re-established; a nomenclatural distinction between the original regime and the new regime is thus necessary for historiographical purpose. Major exceptions to this historiographical practice include the Western Qin, the Southern Liang, and the Tang dynasty; the first two were interrupted by the Later Qin, while the continuity of the latter was broken by the Wu Zhou.

In Chinese sources, the term "dynasty" is usually omitted when referencing dynasties that have prefixes in their historiographical names. Such a practice is sometimes adopted in English usage, even though the inclusion of the word "dynasty" is also widely seen in English scholarly writings. For example, the Northern Zhou is also sometimes referred to as the "Northern Zhou dynasty".

Often, scholars would refer to a specific Chinese dynasty by attaching the word "China" after the dynastic name. For instance, "Tang China" refers to the Chinese state under the rule of the Tang dynasty and the corresponding historical era.

Territorial extent

While the earliest orthodox Chinese dynasties were established along the Yellow River and the Yangtze River in China proper, numerous Chinese dynasties later expanded beyond the region to encompass other territorial domains.

At various points in time, Chinese dynasties exercised control over China proper (including Hainan, Macau, and Hong Kong), Taiwan, Manchuria (both Inner Manchuria and Outer Manchuria), Sakhalin, Mongolia (both Inner Mongolia and Outer Mongolia), Vietnam, Tibet, Xinjiang, as well as parts of Central Asia, the Korean Peninsula, Afghanistan, and Siberia.

Territorially, the largest orthodox Chinese dynasty was either the Yuan dynasty or the Qing dynasty, depending on the historical source. This discrepancy can be mainly attributed to the ambiguous northern border of the Yuan realm: whereas some sources describe the Yuan border as located to the immediate north of the northern shore of Lake Baikal, others posit that the Yuan dynasty reached as far north as the Arctic coast, with its western boundary in Siberia delimited by the Obʹ and Irtysh rivers until the latter met the boundary of the Chagatai Khanate. In contrast, the borders of the Qing dynasty were demarcated and reinforced through a series of international treaties, and thus were more well-defined.

Apart from exerting direct control over the Chinese realm, various dynasties of China also maintained hegemony over other states and tribes through the Chinese tributary system. The Chinese tributary system first emerged during the Western Han and lasted until the 19th century AD when the Sinocentric order broke down.

The modern territorial claims of both the People's Republic of China and the Republic of China are inherited from the lands once held by the Qing dynasty at the time of its collapse.

List of major Chinese dynasties
This list includes only the major dynasties of China that are typically found in simplified forms of Chinese historical timelines. This list is neither comprehensive nor representative of Chinese history as a whole.

Timelines

Timeline of major historical periods

Timeline of major regimes

See also

 1911 Revolution
 Ancient Chinese states
 Chinese expansionism
 Chinese historiography
 Chinese sovereign
 Conquest dynasty
 Debate on the Chineseness of Yuan and Qing dynasties
 Dragon Throne
 Dynastic cycle
 East Asian cultural sphere
 Eighteen Kingdoms
 Emperor at home, king abroad
 Emperor of China
 Family tree of Chinese monarchs (ancient)
 Family tree of Chinese monarchs (early)
 Family tree of Chinese monarchs (late)
 Family tree of Chinese monarchs (middle)
 Family tree of Chinese monarchs (Warring States period)
 Fanzhen
 Fengjian
 Golden ages of China
 Historical capitals of China
 Jiedushi
 Jimi system
 List of Chinese monarchs
 List of Confucian states and dynasties
 List of Mongol states
 List of recipients of tribute from China
 List of tributary states of China
 List of Turkic dynasties and countries
 List of Vietnamese dynasties
 Little China (ideology)
 Mandate of Heaven
 Monarchy of China
 Names of China
 Pax Sinica
 Six Dynasties
 Succession to the Chinese throne
 Three Sovereigns and Five Emperors
 Tianxia
 Timeline of Chinese history
 Tributary system of China
 Tusi
 Twenty-Four Histories
 Xia–Shang–Zhou Chronology Project
 Zhonghua minzu

Notes

References

Citations

Sources 

 China Handbook Editorial Committee, China Handbook Series: History (trans., Dun J. Li), Beijing, 1982, pp. 188–189; and Shao Chang Lee, "China Cultural Development" (wall chart), East Lansing, 1984.
  Specifically Section A.2 "Dynasties", in this and earlier editions, which includes subsections on "Naming the Dynasties", "Sets of Dynasties", "The Dynastic Cycle", "Legitimate Succession", "Grade School History" (the effect on common understanding of China's history).

External links

 Columbia University. The Dynasties Song
 Tan Qixiang. The Historical Atlas of China

 
Chinese
Royalty-related lists